C23 is a secondary route in Namibia that runs from Leonardville to the B6 near Hosea Kutako International Airport via Dordabis.

References

Roads in Namibia